Blanche S. Marvin  ( Schein; born 17 January 1925) is an American-born theatre critic, producer, writer, and former actress and dancer who is based in the United Kingdom.

Life and career
Blanche Schein was born in Brooklyn, New York City on 17 January 1925. She later adopted the name of Blanche Zohar. She reportedly left home at age 14 to act and dance on Broadway, before appearing in Lute Song (1946), which starred Mary Martin and Yul Brynner. 
 
Marvin was reportedly courted by Marlon Brando and became a close friend of Tennessee Williams, whom she met through Margo Jones, who directed the Broadway production of The Glass Menagerie. Marvin later  claimed Williams had named his lead character in A Streetcar Named Desire, Blanche DuBois, after her. She married American producer Mark Marvin, 17 years her senior. She created the Empty Space Peter Brook Award in 1991, and endowed it personally.

Marvin was made an Honorary Member of the Order of the British Empire (MBE) in 2010, for services to theatre, and appeared as a "castaway" on the BBC Radio programme Desert Island Discs on 16 November 2012.

A widow since 1958, she lives in St John's Wood, north London. She had two children by her marriage to Mark Marvin.

Bibliography

References

External links 
 Blanche Marvin's London Theatre Views 

1925 births
Living people
American musical theatre actresses
American female dancers
Writers from New York City
Honorary Members of the Order of the British Empire
American emigrants to the United Kingdom